The Flame Trees of Thika is a British television serial of seven 50-minute episodes made by Euston Films for Thames Television in 1981. It was adapted by John Hawkesworth from the 1959 book of the same title by Elspeth Huxley, and is set in and around the town of Thika in Kenya's Central Province. The story deals with the lives of British settlers in this part of East Africa in 1913, when the country was a British colony, up to the start of World War One.

The series stars Hayley Mills (in her first starring role after a six-year performing hiatus), Holly Aird, David Robb and Ben Cross.

Plot

Robin Grant (David Robb), his wife Tilly (Hayley Mills) and daughter Elspeth (Holly Aird) move to British East Africa (now called Kenya) to set up a coffee plantation. They meet Piet Roos (Morgan Sheppard), a Boer big game hunter, and Njombo, a native who goes to work for them. The Grants face many travails in getting established, but these improve after they hire another native, Sammy, as the headman of the plantation.

Hereward (Nicholas Jones) and Lettice Palmer (Sharon Maughan) move to the area. There is a fight between Roos and Sammy. Then Njombo kills Kimon, who was the Palmers' headman. As a result, his chief strips him of his property and Sammy marries the girl Njombo wanted.

While her parents and the Palmers are on a trip to Nairobi, Elspeth has a very interesting New Year's Eve party with Mrs. Nimmo, who tends to the area's medical needs, and a newcomer to the area, Alec Wilson.

A horse trader and safari leader, Ian Crawford (Ben Cross), arrives in the area. He is infatuated with Lettice Palmer, who gives a pony to Elspeth. We learn Lettice left her first husband to elope with Hereward. Elspeth develops an intense dislike for Hereward Palmer after he shoots a baby antelope on a hunt.

Sammy arranges for a curse to be put on Njombo, and it literally takes an “Act of God” to get it lifted.

After the railroad reaches Thika, Lettice gets a piano, but during a party held to celebrate its arrival, a leopard kills one of her dogs. During the hunt to get it, Hereward kills the leopard but is almost killed by its mate; he is saved by Roos.

The Palmers, Tilly, and Crawford go on a safari, during which Lettice and Crawford have an affair. Hereward and Crawford are about to have a brawl when Crawford's servant stabs Hereward. As a result, Crawford leaves and Lettice stays with Hereward.

On 4 August 1914, the Grants learn war has been declared on Germany. Robin joins the army, while Tilly becomes a nurse and Elspeth goes to school, where she is bullied for being a know-it-all. She runs away back to Thika. Ian Crawford is killed in the war. Robin is transferred to France so all the Grants leave Africa and return to Europe for the duration.

Production
The Flame Trees of Thika was filmed on location in Kenya, directed by Roy Ward Baker and produced by Hawkesworth and  Christopher Neame with Verity Lambert as executive producer. The filming included aerial views of the actual Kenya-Uganda railway train as it traveled between Mombasa and Nairobi heading toward Uganda.

The television series was nominated for three BAFTA Television Awards, including Ian Wilson for Best Cinematography.

It was originally transmitted on the ITV network from 1 September to 13 October 1981. Baker says it was very popular.

It is available on DVD.

See also
 Red Strangers - a related novel by Elspeth Huxley.
 Out of Africa - book which begins in the same period in British East Africa.

Notes

External links
 

1981 British television series debuts
1981 British television series endings
1980s British drama television series
British television miniseries
Films set in Kenya
ITV television dramas
Television series set in the 1910s
Television shows based on British novels
Television series by Fremantle (company)
Television shows produced by Thames Television
English-language television shows
Television series by Euston Films
1980s English-language films